Mas-related G-protein coupled receptor member X2 is a protein that in humans is encoded by the MRGPRX2 gene.
It is most abundant on cutaneous mast cells.

Agonists are gyrase inhibitors like ciprofloxacin and non-depolarizing neuromuscular blocking agents like atracurium as well as vancomycin. Activation of MRGPRX2 leads to mast cell degranulation with subsequent pseudo-allergic reactions.

See also
 MAS1 oncogene

References

Further reading

G protein-coupled receptors